Swimfan is a 2002 American teen psychological thriller film directed by John Polson and written by Charles Bohl and Phillip Schneider. Starring Jesse Bradford, Erika Christensen, and Shiri Appleby, the film is about a high school swimming star who finds himself stalked by a teenage seductress after a one-night stand.

The plot drew comparisons to similar films like Fatal Attraction and Play Misty for Me, and was also panned by critics.

Plot
Ben Cronin is a star swimmer of his high school's swim team. His coach informs him that Stanford University scouts will appear at next week's swim meet. Ben and his girlfriend Amy discuss their future plans. Amy wants to attend school in Rhode Island but explains she will go to school in California to stay close to Ben. The next day, Ben nearly runs his car into Madison Bell and gives her a ride home as an apology. Later, he realizes that Madison left her notebook in his car. The notebook is filled with music notes, and Ben spots his initials written inside a staff. When he returns the notebook, he meets Madison's cousin, Christopher. Madison appears stressed and explains she has not eaten, so Ben offers to take her to a diner. At the diner, Ben tells Madison about his girlfriend, but Madison does not appear too bothered and explains that she has a boy waiting for her in New York City.

Ben shares some of his past with Madison: he began doing drugs five years ago, which led to crime and six months in juvenile hall, which "saved him" because he ultimately realized his passion and talent for swimming. Although Ben tries to end the date, Madison convinces him to go to the pool. Her aggressive flirtation lures Ben in, and despite his initial hesitancy, the two have sex. Both agree to remain friends and not to discuss their encounter.

The next night, Ben goes to a party at Amy's house. Amy introduces Ben to her new friend, who turns out to be Madison. The two pretend to have not met one another. Shortly after, Madison obsesses over Ben—she stops by his house to meet his mom and bombards Ben with e-mails and instant messages. Ben realizes her unhealthy behavior and demands her to leave him alone. Ben's lying eats at him, but before he confesses, Madison tells Amy first. Madison dates Ben's rival teammate, Josh. Right before their biggest swim competition, Ben is disqualified for having steroids in his urine. Outraged and suspecting Madison had Josh set him up, he confronts Josh about the drug test, revealing his suspicion. Days later, Madison accidentally calls Josh by Ben's name while they are kissing in a car. Josh realizes that Madison's obsession with Ben is real and tells her off.

Ben tries to tell Amy everything, but she doesn’t believe him. The next day, he goes to the pool, where he finds Josh dead. The police suspect that Ben murdered Josh, so to prove his innocence, Ben breaks into Madison's room to find evidence, where he discovers a bottle of steroids and a creepy shrine of his personal belongings she has been secretly stashing. Christopher warns Ben of a similar case regarding a man named Jake Donnelly. When Ben visits Jake in the hospital, a nurse tells him that Jake's girlfriend Madison survived the crash.

Disguising herself as Ben, Madison steals his car, follows Amy home from school and runs her off the road, with Ben being framed for the crime. That night at the hospital, Ben and a few friends record Madison confessing her crime and intentions, resulting in her arrest. She escapes custody by stealing an officer's gun and shooting the two policemen escorting her, then enters Ben's house and drags Amy to the school's swimming pool. After watching Madison throw a handcuffed and chairbound Amy into the pool, Ben dives in. Madison attacks them with the handle of a pool cleaner, and Ben grabs one end, pulling her into the pool. Unable to swim, Madison drowns while Ben frees the drowned Amy from her handcuffs, carries her out of the pool, and then resuscitates her via mouth-to-mouth artificial respiration. Later, after watching a swim meet, Ben goes outside to his car, where he and Amy kiss and drive away.

Cast
 Jesse Bradford as Ben Cronin
 Erika Christensen as Madison Bell
 Shiri Appleby as Amy Miller
 Kate Burton as Carla Cronin
 Clayne Crawford as Josh
 Jason Ritter as Randy
 Kia Joy Goodwin as Rene
 Dan Hedaya as Coach Simkins
 Michael Higgins as Mr. Tillman
 Nick Sandow as Detective John Zabel
 Pamela Isaacs as Mrs. Egan
 Phyllis Somerville as Aunt Gretchen 
 James DeBello as Christopher
 Monroe Mann as Jake Donnelly
 Patricia Rae as Jake's nurse

Filming 
The film was shot in New Jersey and New York. It was partly financed by Furthur Films, a production company founded by actor Michael Douglas.

Release
Swimfan opened in the number one spot at the North American box office in its first week of release, earning $12.4 million and beating My Big Fat Greek Wedding and City by the Sea.

The film was distributed by 20th Century Fox in most countries, but Icon Film Distribution distributed it in the United Kingdom. The worldwide box office gross was $34.4 million; nearly a third of that came from its first-place opening weekend in the US. Director John Polson credited the film’s strong opening weekend to Fox’s marketing campaign.

Reception
Rotten Tomatoes, a review aggregator, reports that 15% of 91 surveyed critics gave the film a positive review; the average rating is 3.9/10.  The consensus is, "A Fatal Attraction rip-off, Swimfan is a predictable, mediocre thriller." Peter Bradshaw gave the film two stars out of five, calling it a "teen Fatal Attraction with an unappetising extra helping of Scream and saying it lacks "the sardonic wit that parts of the script had seemed initially to promise".  Variety described it as a "chiller resolutely without chills, in which even the pool water always seems heated. And inasmuch as the pic never owns up to its own trashiness, it's not even enjoyable camp—like Mary Lambert's recent The In Crowd—even though there's about as much underage drinking, heavy petting and full-on sex as you can imagine this side of a very surprising PG-13 rating."

Soundtrack

See also

References

External links
 
 
 
 

2002 films
2000s teen films
2002 psychological thriller films
American teen films
American psychological thriller films
Films about infidelity
Films about stalking
Films set in New Jersey
Films shot in New Jersey
Swimming films
20th Century Fox films
Films directed by John Polson
Films scored by Louis Febre
2000s English-language films
2000s American films